Christopher Sarandon (born July 24, 1942) is an American actor. He is well known for playing a variety of iconic characters, including Jerry Dandrige in Fright Night (1985), Prince Humperdinck in The Princess Bride (1987), Detective Mike Norris in Child's Play (1988), and Jack Skellington in The Nightmare Before Christmas (1993). He was nominated for the Academy Award for Best Supporting Actor for his performance as Leon Shermer in Dog Day Afternoon (1975).

Early life
Chris Sarandon was born and raised in Beckley, West Virginia, the son of restaurateurs Chris and Cliffie (née Cardullias) Sarandon. His father, whose surname was originally "Sarondonedes", was born in Istanbul, Turkey, of Greek ancestry; his mother is also of Greek descent.

Sarandon graduated from Woodrow Wilson High School in Beckley. He earned a degree in speech at West Virginia University. He earned his master's degree in theater from The Catholic University of America (CUA) in Washington, D.C.

Career

After graduation, he toured with numerous improvisational companies and became much involved with regional theatre, making his professional debut in the play The Rose Tattoo during 1965. In 1968, Sarandon moved to New York City, where he obtained his first television role as Dr. Tom Halverson for the series The Guiding Light (1973–1974). He appeared in the primetime television movies The Satan Murders (1974) and Thursday's Game before obtaining the role in Dog Day Afternoon (1975), a performance which earned him nominations for Best New Male Star of the Year at the Golden Globes and the Academy Award for Best Supporting Actor.

Sarandon appeared in the Broadway play The Rothschilds and The Two Gentlemen of Verona, as well making regular appearances at numerous Shakespeare and George Bernard Shaw festivals in the United States and Canada. He also had a series of television roles, some of which (such as A Tale of Two Cities in 1980) corresponded to his affinity for the classics. He also had roles in the thriller movie Lipstick (1976) and as a demon in the movie The Sentinel (1977).

To avoid being typecast in villainous roles, Sarandon accepted various roles of other types during the years to come, portraying the title role of Christ in the made-for-television movie The Day Christ Died (1980). He received accolades for his portrayal of Sydney Carton in a TV-movie version of A Tale of Two Cities (1980), co-starred with Dennis Hopper in the 1983 movie The Osterman Weekend, which was based on the Robert Ludlum novel of the same name, and co-starred with Goldie Hawn in the movie Protocol (1984). These were followed by another mainstream success as the vampire-next-door in the horror movie Fright Night (1985). He starred in the 1986 TV movie Liberty, which addressed the making of New York City's Statue of Liberty.

One of his most endearing roles onscreen, is that of Prince Humperdinck in Rob Reiner's 1987 movie The Princess Bride, though he also has had supporting parts in many other successful films, including his lead turn in the original horror classic Child's Play (1988). In 1992, he played Joseph Curwen/Charles Dexter Ward in The Resurrected. He also played Jack Skellington, the main character of Tim Burton's animated Disney movie The Nightmare Before Christmas (1993), and has since reprised the role in other productions, including the Disney/Square video games Kingdom Hearts and Kingdom Hearts II and the Capcom sequel to the original movie, Oogie's Revenge. Sarandon also reprised his role as Jack Skellington for several Disneyland Halloween events and attractions including; Halloween Screams, the Frightfully Fun Parade, and the Haunted Mansion Holiday, a three-month overlay of the Haunted Mansion, where Jack and his friends take control of a mansion in an attempt to introduce Christmas, much as his character did in the movie.

Sarandon appeared in TV again with a recurring role as Dr. Burke on NBC's long-running medical drama ER.

In 1991 he performed on Broadway in the short-lived musical Nick & Nora (based on the movie The Thin Man) with Joanna Gleason, the daughter of Monty Hall. Sarandon married Gleason in 1994. They have appeared together in a number of movies, including Edie & Pen (1996), American Perfekt (1997), and Let the Devil Wear Black (1999). During the 2000s he made guest appearances in several TV series, notably as the Necromancer demon, Armand, in Charmed, and as superior court judge Barry Krumble for six episodes of Judging Amy.

In 2006 he played Signor Naccarelli in the six-time Tony award-winning Broadway musical play The Light in the Piazza at Lincoln Center. Most recently he appeared in Cyrano de Bergerac as Antoine de Guiche, with Kevin Kline, Jennifer Garner, and Daniel Sunjata.

In 2016 he performed in the Off-Broadway production of the Dave Malloy musical Preludes as Anton Chekhov, Tchaikovsky, Alexander Glazunov, Leo Tolstoy, Tsar Nicholas II,  and The Master.

He is on the advisory board for the Greenbrier Valley Theatre in Lewisburg, West Virginia.

Personal life
Sarandon has been married three times: he married actress Susan Sarandon in 1967. The two met while attending The Catholic University of America together in Washington, D.C. The marriage lasted for twelve years; the pair divorced in 1979. After divorcing from Susan, he married his second wife, fashion model Lisa Ann Cooper, in 1980. The couple had two daughters and one son: Stephanie (born 1982), Alexis (born 1984) and Michael (born 1988). After nine years, the marriage ended in divorce in 1989. In 1994, he married his third wife, actress and singer Joanna Gleason. The couple met while performing in Broadway's short-lived 1991 musical Nick & Nora; they returned to the stage together in 1998's Thorn and Bloom. They also collaborated in several films together, such as Road Ends, Edie & Pen, Let the Devil Wear Black, and American Perfekt.

Filmography

Film

Television

Video games

Theme parks and live attractions 
 Haunted Mansion Holiday – Jack Skellington
 Halloween Screams – Jack Skellington
 Frightfully Fun Parade – Jack Skellington
 Disney on Ice – Jack Skellington

Music videos 
 Hands Clean — Alanis Morissette

Theatre

Awards and nominations

References

External links

 
 
 
 Chris Sarandon – Downstage Center interview at American Theatre Wing.org
The West Virginia & Regional History Center at West Virginia University houses the papers of Chris Sarandon as a part of the Distinguished West Virginians Archive

1942 births
20th-century American male actors
21st-century American male actors
Male actors from West Virginia
American male film actors
American male musical theatre actors
American people of Greek descent
American male stage actors
American male television actors
Living people
People from Beckley, West Virginia
Catholic University of America alumni
Woodrow Wilson High School (Beckley, West Virginia) alumni
American male voice actors
American male video game actors